Lourence Gregorio Ilagan (born 11 February 1978) is a Filipino professional soft-tip and steel-tip darts player who plays currently in Professional Darts Corporation (PDC) and international soft-tip events. His biggest achievement to date was advanced to the semi-finals of the World Masters before he lost to Robbie Green. He has represented the Philippines during the WDF Asia-Pacific Cup and PDC World Cup of Darts.

Career
Ilagan is a two-time quarter-finalist (2000 and 2006) in the WDF Asia-Pacific Cup.  He has also reached the final of the Philippines Open in 2006 and 2007 along with the final of the 2008 Malaysian Open. Ilagan won the National Darts Federation of the Philippines qualifier to earn a place in the 2009 PDC World Darts Championship but was beaten by Finland's Marko Kantele 5–2 in the Preliminary Round.

Ilagan reached the semi-finals of the 2009 Winmau World Masters after qualifying from the earlier rounds into the last 16, where he defeated number two seed Scott Waites and then beat Steve West in the quarter-finals.  He lost to Robbie Green in the semi-final.

Ilagan represented the Philippines with Christian Perez in the 2012 PDC World Cup of Darts and  together they were beaten 5–3 by the United States in the first round.

Ilagan won the Philippines Qualifying Event for the 2013 World Championship and once there came back from three to one down in legs to Jamie Lewis in the preliminary round to win 4–3. He faced Colin Osborne in the first round and despite impressing with some clinical finishes, he lost 3–0. He was due to play with Perez once more in the 2013 World Cup of Darts but they were forced to withdraw due to travel problems. Later in the year he won the Hong Kong Open by beating Edward Santos in the final.

He defeated Perez 4–1 to win the 2013 World Soft Darts Championship having eliminated Stephen Bunting in the quarter-finals and Randy Van Deursen in the semis. Ilagan credited his eight hours a day practice routine in being key to his success and he earned $1,000,000 HK in the process. In 2014, Ilagan was beaten in the semi-finals of the Chinese Dartslive event.

Ilagan won the 2015 Soft Tip Dartslive Asia Open by beating Hyun Chul Park in the final. He partnered Gilbert Ulang at the World Cup of Darts and they lost 5–1 to Belgium in the opening round. A victory over Daisuke Akamatsu saw Ilagan claim the Malaysian Open. He came within a match of playing in the 2016 World Championship, but lost 3–2 to Alex Tagarao in the final of the Philippines Qualifier.

World Championship results

PDC
 2009: Preliminary round (lost to Marko Kantele 2–5) (legs)
 2013: First round (lost to Colin Osborne 0–3) (sets)
 2019: First round (lost to Vincent van der Voort 1–3)
 2020: First round (lost to Cristo Reyes 2–3)
 2021: First round (lost to Ryan Murray 1–3)
 2022: First round (lost to Raymond van Barneveld 0–3)
 2023: Second round (lost to Dimitri Van den Bergh 0–3)

Performance timeline

BDO

PDC

References

External links
Profile and stats on Darts Database

1978 births
Filipino darts players
Living people
Professional Darts Corporation associate players
People from Cainta
Sportspeople from Rizal
PDC World Cup of Darts Filipino team